Kuchkunji Khan (1452–1531) - a descendant of the Timurid Mirzo Ulugbek, the third representative of the Uzbek dynasty of Shaybanids, who ruled in the Bukhara Khanate in 1512–1531.

After the death of Muhammad Shaybani Khan, his uncle, a descendant of Mirzo Ulugbek, Suyunchkhoja Khan (1511–1512), was elected the Supreme Khan of the dynasty for a short time. At the end of 1512, all the Shaybanid sultans gathered in Samarkand and, with the consent of Ubaydulla Khan, called here the elder brother of Sunchkhoja Khan, Kuchkunji Sultan, to be the ruler. After that, Suyunchhoja Khan renounces the title of Supreme Khan and, as seniority, transfers it to his older brother. Kuchkunji Khan (1512–1530) becomes the Supreme Khan of the Bukharan khanate.
In 1513–1523, Kuchkunji Khan carried out a monetary reform, which, unlike Shaybani Khan's monetary reform, was less thoughtful and took about 10 years. However, it contributed to the growth of the economy and trade. 

The title of Kuchkunji Khan "Sultan Khakan Abu Mansur Bahadurkhan", as well as the names of the first four caliphs, were placed on the coins.

References

Sources 
 Robert D. McChesney. Central Asia VI. In the 16th-18th Centuries / Encyclopædia Iranica — Vol. V, Fasc. 2, pp. 176−193
 Robert D. McChesney, Waqf in Central Asia: Four Hundred Years in the History of a Muslim Shrine, 1480–1889. Princeton University Press, 1991

1452 births
1531 deaths
Khanate of Bukhara